Libya–Yugoslavia relations were historical foreign relations between Libya and now split-up Socialist Federal Republic of Yugoslavia. Two countries established formal diplomatic relations in 1955.

During the Cold War both countries actively participated in the work of the Non-Aligned Movement. Within the movement Yugoslavia belonged to the movement's self-described core members which advocated for equidistance towards both blocs during the Cold War, while Libya often aligned itself to the group of self-described progressive members more aligned towards the Soviet Union. Despite this Yugoslavia advocated for close cooperation of Euro–Mediterranean members of the movement as the response to exclusive Asian–African or Tricontinental (Asia-Africa-Latin America) initiatives. Belgrade perceived them as the effort by Soviets to undermine and obscure Yugoslav and Mediterranean place within the movement.

President of Yugoslavia Josip Broz Tito officially visited Libya on three occasions in 1970, 1977 and 1979. King Idris of Libya visited Yugoslavia between 8–21 August 1969 while Colonel Muammar Gaddafi visited Yugoslavia during President Tito's lifetime in 1973, 1977 and 1978. Cordial relations between the two countries eventually evolved into a military trade in which Libya became a prime client for Yugoslav weapons and among other equipment bought 116 Yugoslav-made Galeb G-2 jet planes. Significant economic cooperation developed in other non-military fields with number of Yugoslav companies and workers working in Libya. Direct flights between Sarajevo–Belgrade–Tripoli run approximately 2 or 3 times per week. Despite being a European socialist state with the closest relations with the United States, Yugoslavia strongly condemned the 1986 United States bombing of Libya.

See also
 Yugoslavia and the Non-Aligned Movement
 Yugoslavia and the Organisation of African Unity
 Death and state funeral of Josip Broz Tito
 Yugoslav Wars
 NATO bombing of Yugoslavia
 First Libyan Civil War
 2011 military intervention in Libya
 Libya–Serbia relations
 Croatia–Libya relations
 Libyan dinar
 Yugoslav dinar

References

Bilateral relations of Yugoslavia
Yugoslavia
Bosnia and Herzegovina–Libya relations
Croatia–Libya relations
Libya–Montenegro relations
Libya–Serbia relations